Shree K. Nayar is an engineer and computer scientist known for his contributions to the fields of computer vision, computational imaging, and  computer graphics. He is the T. C. Chang Professor of Computer Science in the School of Engineering at Columbia University. Nayar co-directs the Columbia Vision and Graphics Center and is the head of the Computer Vision Laboratory (CAVE), which develops advanced imaging and computer vision systems. Nayar also serves as a director of research at Snap Inc. He was elected member of the US National Academy of Engineering in 2008 and the American Academy of Arts and Sciences in 2011 for his pioneering work on computational cameras and physics based computer vision.

Education and career
Nayar received a B.E. in electrical engineering from Birla Institute of Technology in Mesra, in 1984, and an M.S. in electrical and computer engineering from North Carolina State University in Raleigh in 1986.  He received a Ph.D. in electrical and computer engineering from The Robotics Institute at Carnegie Mellon University in Pittsburgh in 1991.

Nayar worked as a research engineer for Taylor Instruments in New Delhi in 1984.  From 1986 to 1990 he was a graduate research assistant at The Robotics Institute at Carnegie Mellon University.  In the summer of 1989, he was a visiting researcher at Hitachi Ltd. in Yokohama, Japan.  He joined the faculty of the Computer Science Department at Columbia University in 1991, and in 2009 he became chair of the department. Nayar also serves as a director of research at Snap Inc.

Research
Nayar's research is in the field of computational imaging and computer vision and focuses on the creation of novel cameras, physics based models for vision and graphics, and algorithms for image understanding.  His work is motivated by applications in the fields of machine vision, digital imaging, computer graphics, robotics, and human-computer interactions.  Nayar developed the concept of computational cameras and is a leading researcher in the field of computational imaging and computer vision. The field of computational photography is organized according to a taxonomy proposed by him.

Nayar's inventions include cameras that can capture 360 degree, high dynamic range, and three-dimensional images. He demonstrated the concept of a self-powered camera that can produce video using power harvested by the light captured by the camera without requiring an external power source. His method of using assorted pixels for single-shot high dynamic range imaging has been incorporated into image sensors that are currently being used by cameras in smartphones, tablets and other mobile devices.  In 2017, Popular Photography published a profile of Nayar that describes his impact on digital imaging and smartphone cameras.

Nayar developed the Oren–Nayar Reflectance Model in collaboration with Michael Oren in 1994, which is widely used in commercial graphics rendering packages. In 2009, he created the Bigshot Camera, a kid-friendly digital camera designed for experiential learning.  Workshops and programs designed around the Bigshot camera have been used to educate middle school students around the world, in particular in underserved communities. As of August 2021, he has published over 300 scientific publications, holds over 80 patents on inventions related to imaging, computer vision and robotics,  his publications have been cited close to 60,000 times, and he has an h-index of 129. In March 2021, Nayar made publicly available a lecture series titled First Principles of Computer Vision.

Recognition
Nayar has received several best paper awards for his scientific publications, including the David Marr Prize in 1990 and 1995, and the Helmholtz Prize in 2019. Early in his career, he received the National Young Investigator Award from the National Science Foundation in 1991 and the Packard Fellowship from the David and Lucile Packard Foundation in 1992. For the impact of his research, he has been honored with the NTT Distinguished Scientific Achievement Award from NTT Corporation in 1994, the Appreciation Honor from Sony Corporation in 2014, the 2016 Invention Award from Popular Science magazine, the PAMI Distinguished Award from IEEE in 2019, and the Funai Achievement Award from the Information Processing Society of Japan in 2021. He has been recognized for his talents as a teacher with the Keck Engineering Teaching Excellence Award from the W. M. Keck Foundation in 1995, the Columbia Great Teacher Award from the Society of Columbia Graduates in 2006, and the Distinguished Faculty Teaching Award from the Columbia Engineering Alumni Association in 2015. He received the Alumni Achievement Award from Carnegie Mellon University in 2009 and the Distinguished Alumnus Award from the Birla Institute of Technology, Mesra, in 2021. For his pioneering research contributions and inventions in the fields of computational imaging and computer vision, he was elected to the National Academy of Engineering in 2008, the American Academy of Arts and Sciences in 2011, and the National Academy of Inventors in 2014.

References

External links
Shree K. Nayar’s Home Page
Computer Science Department, Columbia University
Columbia Engineering 
Columbia University 
National Academy of Engineering
American Academy of Arts and Sciences 
National Academy of Inventors
National Science Foundation
David and Lucile Packard Foundation
W. M. Keck Foundation
Snap Research
First Principles of Computer Vision

Columbia University faculty
Columbia School of Engineering and Applied Science faculty
Carnegie Mellon University alumni
North Carolina State University alumni
Members of the United States National Academy of Engineering
Living people
Year of birth missing (living people)